Mark Steven Hutton (born 6 February 1970) is an Australian former right-handed pitcher in Major League Baseball.

Hutton made his major league debut as a starting pitcher in 1993 for the New York Yankees, five years after moving to the United States.

He was later traded to the Florida Marlins, then to Colorado Rockies and finally to the Reds.  Granted free agency, he signed for Tampa Bay, but never appeared for the Devil Rays in the major league, nor for an affiliated team in the minors.  His final baseball appearances in the United States were for minor league teams associated with the Houston Astros.

He was a member of the Australia national baseball team that finished in seventh place at the 2000 Summer Olympics.

See also
 List of players from Australia in Major League Baseball

References

External links

1970 births
Australian expatriate baseball players in the United States
Baseball players at the 2000 Summer Olympics
Cincinnati Reds players
Living people
Major League Baseball players from Australia
Major League Baseball pitchers
Florida Marlins players
Colorado Rockies players
New York Yankees players
Sportspeople from Adelaide
Olympic baseball players of Australia
Albany-Colonie Yankees players
Columbus Clippers players
Fort Lauderdale Yankees players
Greensboro Hornets players
Indianapolis Indians players
New Orleans Zephyrs players
Oneonta Yankees players
Round Rock Express players
Tampa Yankees players